Ben Whittam (27 August 1909 – 22 April 1995) was an Australian rules footballer who played for the North Melbourne Football Club in the Victorian Football League (VFL).

Notes

External links 

1909 births
1995 deaths
Australian rules footballers from Victoria (Australia)
North Melbourne Football Club players